Lower City is a 2005 Brazilian drama film directed by Sérgio Machado. It was released in Brazil and to international film festivals in 2005, including being screened in the Un Certain Regard section at the 2005 Cannes Film Festival. Its general release in the United States was in 2006 in New York.

Plot
Lifelong friends Deco and Naldinho share ownership of an old, rusting boat in Salvador, Brazil. A strong bond exists between the two men, transcending their racial differences. "No woman will come between us," Naldinho tells Deco, and Deco concurs: "All the women in the world couldn't come between us."

That bond is tested after the men meet Karinna, a dancer and prostitute. Karinna needs a ride, and she offers the two men her "services" in exchange for transport on their boat and a little cash.

The emotional entanglements that result from Karinna's "deal" are stronger than the trio expected. Deco and Naldinho develop a desire to possess Karinna. Karinna's desires are more subtle, though it is clear that she feels both a sisterly affection and sexual attraction toward the two men. Karinna gets pregnant and decides to abort as she does not seem to know or care who the father is. She puts the two friends at odds with each other, however they are able to overcome her destructive influence.

Cast
Lázaro Ramos as Deco
Wagner Moura as Naldinho
Alice Braga as Karinna
Harildo Deda as Careca
Maria Menezes as Luzinete
João Miguel as Edvan
Débora Santiago as Sirlene
José Dumont as Sergipano

References

Notes
 Scott, A.O. (2006, June 16). A Love Triangle With Soft Edges. The New York Times, p. B16

External links 
 

2005 drama films
2005 films
Brazilian drama films
Films directed by Sérgio Machado
Films shot in Salvador, Bahia
2000s Portuguese-language films